Eleonora Bechis (born 19 March 1974) is an Italian politician.

Born in Turin,  Bechis graduated from an institute for hotel and restaurant professional services, and worked as a metallurgical worker.

In 2013 Bechis was elected deputy  for the 5 Star Movement. On 26 January 2015 she announced along with other eight deputies and one senator her exit from the party, and entered the new group Free Alternative.

References

External links 
 
Italian Chamber of Deputies - Eleonora Bechis

1974 births
Living people
Politicians from Turin
Five Star Movement politicians
Free Alternative politicians
Deputies of Legislature XVII of Italy
21st-century Italian women politicians
Women members of the Chamber of Deputies (Italy)